Yesshop (stylised as YESSHOP) was a New Zealand shopping channel. The channel was based on the South Korean model of home shopping.

The channel originally launched in New Zealand on free-to-air television and pay television on 4 November 2013. The channel expanded to Australia via pay television provider Foxtel, launching on 29 February 2016, and later a short-lived run on regional free-to-air television via Southern Cross Austereo on 1 August 2016.

Yesshop's owner, Yes Retail, made the decision to cease trading on 29 September 2016 citing lack of funds to pay wages and the company's current losses of approximately 20 million dollars. Employees' contracts were terminated the same day. On Southern Cross Austereo’s stations, on 17 July 2017, a channel owned by Jimmy Swaggart, SonLife Broadcasting Network, launched using this channel's old spectrum.

References

External links 
 Official website (archived site)

Television channels in New Zealand
2016 disestablishments in New Zealand
English-language television stations in New Zealand
English-language television stations in Australia
Home shopping television stations in Australia
Television channels and stations established in 2013
Defunct television channels in New Zealand
Defunct television channels in Australia
Television channels and stations disestablished in 2016